"You Better Run" is a song by the Young Rascals. Written by group members Eddie Brigati and Felix Cavaliere, it was released as the band's third single in 1966 and reached the top 20 in the United States. This song is noted for its repeated roller coaster musical chords in the bass guitar, going from C to B-flat to C to E-flat to B-flat to C.

Critical reception
A review in a 1966 issue of Billboard magazine described the song as a "big-beat wailer" and a "strong follow-up to 'Good Lovin'. 
In the book Pioneers of Rock and Roll, author Harry Sumrall wrote that the song represented the apex of the band's sound and complimented guitarist Gene Cornish's "slashing chords". AllMusic's Matthew Greenwald called it "a classic garage rocker with a punkish energy [that] showcased the band's live chops to a great effect, as well as Felix Cavaliere's awesome soul-inflected vocals."

Music journalist Fred Bronson noted that "You Better Run" was a commercial disappointment, having peaked at number 20 on the U.S. Billboard Hot 100 after their previous single, "Good Lovin, had reached number one. The Cavaliere and Gene Cornish composition "Love Is a Beautiful Thing" was the single's B-side.

Chart performance

Cover versions

Pat Benatar version

Pat Benatar recorded "You Better Run" for her second album, Crimes of Passion (1980). The song was released as the album's lead single, with "Out-A-Touch" as the B-side.  It peaked at number 42 on the U.S. Billboard Hot 100 chart and number 44 on the Cash Box Top 100.
The song appeared on the soundtrack to the 1980 film Roadie.

On August 1, 1981, the music video for the song was the second video ever broadcast on MTV, after the network premiered with "Video Killed the Radio Star" by the Buggles.

Chart performance

Other versions
In 1966, with the band Listen, Robert Plant made his recording debut singing lead vocals on a cover version of "You Better Run", which was released as a single by CBS Records.

In 1966, the N' Betweens, who later became the British rock band Slade, covered the song, which was released as their debut single on Columbia. It was produced by Kim Fowley and reached number one on the local Midlands chart and remained there for six weeks. The Listen and N' Betweens versions were released on the same day.

Canadian pop-rock band Toronto included a cover of "You Better Run" on their debut album, Looking for Trouble, in 1980.

Peter Criss recorded the song on his first post-KISS solo album, Out of Control, in 1980.

References

1966 songs
1966 singles
1980 singles
Songs written by Felix Cavaliere
Songs written by Eddie Brigati
The Rascals songs
Pat Benatar songs
Eddie and the Hot Rods songs
Song recordings produced by Arif Mardin
Song recordings produced by Tom Dowd
Song recordings produced by Keith Olsen
Atlantic Records singles
Chrysalis Records singles